Starokaypanovo (İśke Qaypan) is a rural locality (a selo) in Bul-Kaypanovsky Selsoviet, Tatyshlinsky District, Bashkortostan, Russia. The population was 357 as of 2010. There are 4 streets.

Geography 
Starokaypanovo is located 15 km northwest of Verkhniye Tatyshly (the district's administrative centre) by road. Novokaypanovo is the nearest rural locality.

References 

Rural localities in Tatyshlinsky District